Eastside Park is a park located in Omak, Washington, a city in the Okanogan region of United States. It was significantly improved in 1965.

References 

Omak, Washington
Parks in Okanogan County, Washington